Park Plaza 605, released as Norman Conquest in the United States, is a 1953 British crime film. Made as a B movie, it stars Tom Conway, Eva Bartok, and Joy Shelton, and also features Sid James and Richard Wattis. It is based on the Norman Conquest series of novels by Berkeley Gray.

Plot
Private investigator Norman Conquest stumbles across a cryptic message being sent by carrier pigeon and his curiosity leads him  to room 605 of the Park Plaza Hotel, where he meets a mysterious foreign blonde woman, and finds himself embroiled in a murder investigation with himself as the prime suspect.

Cast

 Tom Conway as Norman Conquest
 Eva Bartok as Nadina Rodin
 Joy Shelton as Pixie Everard
 Sid James as Superintendent Bill Williams
 Richard Wattis as Theodore Feather
 Carl Jaffe as Boris Roff
 Frederick Schiller as Ivan Burgin
 Robert Adair as Baron von Henschel
 Anton Diffring as Gregor
 Ian Fleming as Colonel Santling
 Edwin Richfield as Mr Reynolds
 Michael Balfour as Ted Birston
 Martin Boddey as Stumpy
 Terence Alexander as Hotel Manager
 Victor Platt as Taxi Driver
 Leon Davey as Mandeville Livingstone
 Richard Marner as Barkov
 Tony Hilton as Lift attendant
 Alan Rolfe as Police inspector
 Derek Prentice as Hall porter
 Frank Sieman as Captain Kramer
 Brian Moorehead as First mate
 Billie Hill as Mrs Pottle
 Anthony Woodruff as Clerk

Critical reception
Radio Times called Park Plaza 605 a "fair British B-feature."

References

External links

1953 films
1953 crime films
Films directed by Bernard Knowles
British crime films
British black-and-white films
Films based on British novels
Films based on mystery novels
1950s English-language films
1950s British films